The economy of the Kansas City metropolitan area is anchored by Kansas City, Missouri, which is the largest city in the state and the 37th largest in the United States. The Kansas City metropolitan area is the 27th largest in the United States, based on the United States Census Bureau's 2004 population estimates. The metro's economy is large and influential to its region.

Companies and employers

The Kansas City metro is the third largest beef-processing city in the US (behind Chicago and Cincinnati), and has the second largest rail network. The area has many factories, manufacturing plants, an official international trade zone, and the most foreign trade zone space in the nation. It has a number of large national and international companies, including these:

 American Century Investments, mutual fund manager and broker
 Associated Wholesale Grocers, grocery wholesale cooperative
 Barkley, Inc., nationally recognized advertising firm
Barts Electric, electrical contractor specializing in commercial and government installations
 Bernstein-Rein, nationally recognized advertising firm
 Black & Veatch Corporation
 BNSF Railway Co., freight railroad network operator
 Burns & McDonnell Engineering
 Bushnell Corporation, manufacturer of outdoor products specializing in optics and imaging
 Cerner Corporation
 Commerce Bancshares, large bank operating in Kansas, Missouri, and Illinois
 Crayola, a division of Hallmark
 Dairy Farmers of America
 Embarq Corporation, large telecommunications company based in Overland Park; it was spun off from Sprint in 2006
 Evergy, electric and gas utility company
 Federal Reserve Bank of Kansas City
 Garmin, develops consumer, aviation, and marine technologies for GPS
 Hallmark Cards, largest greeting card manufacturer in the world (Although Hallmark's gross revenues would generally be more than sufficient for inclusion in the Fortune 500 and 1000, those lists only apply to public companies.  Hallmark is privately held by the Hall family and is thus ineligible for inclusion on the Fortune 500 or 1000.)
 HCA Midwest Health, for-profit hospital system
 HNTB, global infrastructure planning, engineering, and consulting firm
 H&R Block, tax preparation services
 Interstate Bakeries, maker of Wonder Bread, Twinkies, and other products
 JE Dunn Construction, general contractor
 Kansas City Life Insurance, major national insurer
 Kansas City Southern Industries, railway management
 Lockton, insurance brokerage and consulting firm
 Netsmart, health care IT provider
 Polsinelli, law firm
 Populous (company), architectural
 Russell Stover Candies, currently under purchase by Swiss-based company Lindt
 T-Mobile US, one of the largest telecommunications companies in the world; prior to its merger with T-Mobile, Sprint Corporation had its world headquarters in Overland Park.
 VMLY&R, marketing and communications company
 Wish-Bone salad dressing
 YRC Worldwide, one of the largest transportation and logistics companies in the world; based in Overland Park

Other major regional and national non-corporate employers headquartered and/or located in Kansas City include:
 Shook, Hardy & Bacon, major national and international law firm
 University of Missouri - Kansas City, full branch of the University of Missouri

Products
 Ford trucks, including the F-150 and Transit, manufactured at the Ford Kansas City Assembly Plant in Claycomo
 Bon Ami cleaning powder, produced by Faultless Starch/Bon Ami Company of Kansas City
 Chevrolet Malibu and Buick LaCrosse, manufactured at the General Motors Fairfax Assembly Plant in Fairfax, Kansas City
 Dawn dishwashing detergent, manufactured by Procter & Gamble in Kansas City

Federal government
The federal government is the largest employer in Kansas City. In the wider metropolitan area, the federal government, either directly or through contracts, employs 41,500 people. The combined annual payroll of these jobs is more than $3 billion.

The largest federal agencies in the Kansas City area by number of permanent employees are these:
 Department of Defense - 15,294
 Department of Veterans Affairs - 2,740
 Department of Treasury (primarily the IRS) - 2,707
 Social Security Administration - 1,708
 Department of Agriculture - 1,451
 Department of Homeland Security - 1,230
 Department of Justice - 1,210
 Department of Transportation - 1,048
 General Services Administration - 883
 Environmental Protection Agency - 540

The U.S. Postal Service employs more than 6,000 in the Kansas City area. Postal jobs are often counted separately from other federal jobs, because these positions are generally in the excepted service. Employees in these positions cannot earn competitive status or reinstatement rights for traditional federal employment.

Business publications
Kansas City has many business publications. Two of the most prominent are the Kansas City Business Journal (weekly), and Ingram's Magazine (monthly). Many of Kansas City's business scions also frequently appear in the Independent, the local society magazine (weekly), and KC Business Magazine (monthly).

References

External links
 "The Role of Metro Areas in the U.S. Economy" - U.S. Conference of Mayors (2004-2006)
 Economic Development Corporation of Kansas City